Ocker Hill railway station served the area of Ocker Hill, West Midlands, from 1864 to 1916 on the Princes End branch line.

History
The station was opened on 1 July 1864 by the London and North Western Railway. Nearby was Ocker Hill Power Station, which opened in 1897. The station closed on 1 November 1890 but reopened on 1 July 1895, before closing permanently on 1 January 1916. The site is now a retirement home.

References 

Former London and North Western Railway stations
Railway stations in Great Britain opened in 1864
Railway stations in Great Britain closed in 1890
Railway stations in Great Britain opened in 1895
Railway stations in Great Britain closed in 1916
1864 establishments in England
1916 disestablishments in England